Discography is the study and cataloging of sound recordings.

Discography may also refer to:

 Lumbar provocative discography, a medical procedure on intervertebral discs

Albums
 Discography (Jesuit album)
 Discography (Jill Johnson album), 2003
 Discography '93–'99, by Lethargy
 Discography: The Complete Singles Collection, by the Pet Shop Boys

See also